Cymindis zargoides is a species of ground beetle in the subfamily Harpalinae. It was described by Thomas Vernon Wollaston in 1863.

References

zargoides
Beetles described in 1863